Domenico "Mimmo" Lucano (born 31 May 1958) is an Italian politician, who served as the mayor of Riace between 2004 and 2018. He gained international recognition for settling refugees in his village, which was experiencing population decline. In 2021 he was sentenced, in first degree, to 13 years and 2 months in prison for white-collar crimes "committed for personal enrichment, at the expense of the migrants".

Biography
Lucano was born in Melito di Porto Salvo but moved early in his life to Riace. He worked as a teacher for most of his adult life, and was a human rights activist since the 1990s.

Mayor of Riace
He became mayor of Riace in 2004, maintaining the role since then. In 2009, shortly after his first re-election as mayor, Lucano was shot at through the window of a restaurant  and two of his dogs were poisoned and killed.

He gained worldwide attention through his innovative approach to dealing with refugees, in the context of the European migrant crisis. As mayor of Riace, he allowed 450 refugees to settle  among the 1,800 inhabitants of the village, revitalising it and preventing the closure of the local school.

Lucano, came second runner-up in the 2010 World Mayor competition. (The winner Marcelo Ebrard was the Mayor of Mexico City, which has about nine million inhabitants.)

Lucano was also listed by Fortune as one of the world's greatest leaders in 2016; featuring at number 40 in the magazine's listing.

In 2017 he was awarded the Dresden Peace Prize.

In October 2018, the Italian police put Lucano under house arrest for allegedly helping illegal migrants to stay in the country by organising “marriages of convenience”.

In April 2019, Lucano was indicted with other 26 people on charges of abuse of power and aiding illegal immigration. In the same month, he faced another probe regarding alleged false public statement and fraud.

In September 2021, Lucano was sentenced to 13 years and 2 months in prison for aggravated fraud, embezzlement, forgery and abuse of office crimes, aggravated by the conspiracy with his partner Tesfahun Lemlem and several figureheads "in order to continue to enrich themselves, exploiting the migrants". The sentence was nearly double the 7 years and 11 months requested by the prosecution and the entire. Public opinion on the sentence was divided, with voices on the left considering it politically motivated.

References

1958 births
Living people
People from the Province of Reggio Calabria
Mayors of places in Calabria
Italian human rights activists
Italian politicians convicted of crimes
Prisoners and detainees of Italy